Hermann von Hanneken may refer to:

 Hermann von Hanneken (soldier) (1890–1981), German general
 Hermann von Hanneken (chess player) (1810–1886), German chess player